Tongrim County is a kun, or county, in coastal southwestern North P'yŏngan province, North Korea. It borders P'ihyŏn and Ch'ŏnma to the north, Sŏnch'ŏn to the east, Ch'ŏlsan to the southwest and Yŏmju to the west. To the south, it looks out on the Yellow Sea.

Geography
The landscape is dominated by low, rolling hills and basins. The highest point is Munsusan, rising to 736 m on the northern border. Tongrim is drained by the Ch'ŏngch'ŏn River and its tributaries, including the Maryŏng River and the Kokch'ŏn stream. Some 60% of the county is covered by forestland; only 26% of the area is cultivated.

Administrative divisions
Tongrim county is divided into 1 ŭp (town), 2 rodongjagu (workers' districts) and 20 ri (villages):

Climate
The year-round average temperature is 8.8 °C; the January mean is -8.7 °C, while the August average is 24 °C. Annual rainfall averages 1000 mm.

Economy
The cultivated land is irrigated, with crops including rice, maize, soybeans, wheat, barley, and tobacco. Aquaculture is also practiced. There are various mines and factories producing machinery including pumps.

Transportation
The P'yŏngŭi Line of the Korean State Railway passes through Tongrim county on its way between Sinŭiju and P'yŏngyang.

Places of interest
Noted landmarks include Tongrim Falls, a 10-meter waterfall, and the Tongrim Manchurian Ash, which is North Korean natural monument No. 11.

See also
Geography of North Korea
North Pyongan

References

External links

Counties of North Pyongan